Arthur Rooke was a British actor and film director of the silent era. Rooke had worked in the theatre for many years before he went into films. He initially co-directed several films with A.E. Coleby, but later began directing films by himself. By the early 1920s he was one of the more successful British film directors.

Selected filmography
Director
 Thelma (1918)
 God's Clay (1919)
 The Mirage (1920)
 The Lure of Crooning Water (1920)
 A Sporting Double (1922)
 Weavers of Fortune (1922)
 A Bachelor's Baby (1922)
 The Sporting Instinct (1922)
 M'Lord of the White Road (1923)
 The Scandal (1923)
 The Gay Corinthian (1924)
 Nets of Destiny (1924)
 The Wine of Life (1924)
 The Diamond Man (1924)
 The Blue Peter (1928)

Actor
 Thelma (1918)
 God's Clay (1919)

References

Bibliography
 Bamford, Kenton. Distored Images: British National Identity and Film in the 1920s. I.B. Tauris, 1999.

External links
 

Year of birth missing
Year of death missing
English film directors
English male silent film actors
20th-century English male actors
20th-century British male actors